Victoria is the southernmost mainland state of Australia. It is bound to the northwest by South Australia, directly north by New South Wales, and also shares a maritime border with Tasmania across the Bass Strait to the south. Most of Victoria's northern border lies along the Murray River. The eastern half of the state is dominated by the Australian Alps and the surrounding highlands (plateaus and hills) of the Great Dividing Range, which also to a lesser extent extend far into the west of the state and ease off after The Grampians. By comparison the north and northwest of the state is extremely flat with little prominence.

Approximately 80% of Victoria's population lives around the coasts of the Port Phillip Bay and (to a lesser extent) Western Port Bay in the south-central region, chiefly in the state's two largest cities, Melbourne (state capital) and Geelong.

Climate

Victoria has a varied climate despite its small size. It ranges from semi-arid temperate with hot summers in the north-west, to temperate and cool along the coast. Victoria's main land feature, the Great Dividing Range, produces a cooler, mountain climate in the centre of the state. Winters along the coast of the state, particularly around Melbourne, are relatively mild (see chart at right).

The coastal plain south of the Great Dividing Range has Victoria's mildest climate. Air from the Southern Ocean helps reduce the heat of summer and the cold of winter. Melbourne and other large cities are located in this temperate region.

The Mallee and upper Wimmera are Victoria's warmest regions with hot winds blowing from nearby semi-deserts. Except at cool mountain elevations, the inland monthly temperatures are  warmer than around Melbourne (see chart).

The Victorian Alps in the northeast are the coldest part of Victoria. The Alps are part of the Great Dividing Range mountain system extending east–west through the centre of Victoria.

Rainfall 
Rainfall in Victoria increases from south to the northeast, with higher averages in areas of high altitude.

Rain is heaviest in the Otway Ranges and Gippsland in southern Victoria and in the mountainous northeast. Snow generally falls only in the mountains and hills in the centre of the state. Rain falls most frequently in winter, but summer precipitation is heavier. Rainfall is most reliable in Gippsland and the Western District, making them both leading farming areas.

Weatherboxes

Regional divisions
The geography of Victoria has several different divisions depending on the aspect of the geography in question. Geomorphological divisions are listed in the following sections. From a human geographical perspective, the state is divided up into the following regions:

Central 
 Port Phillip Bay area
 Greater Melbourne
 Mornington Peninsula
 Dandenong Ranges
 Werribee Plain
 You Yangs
 Greater Geelong
 Bellarine Peninsula
 Central Highlands
 Yarra Ranges
 Yarra Valley

East and South-East 
 Victorian Alps
 Gippsland
 East Gippsland
 Central Gippsland
 Gippsland Lakes
 Latrobe Valley
 West Gippsland
 South Gippsland
 Strzelecki Ranges
 Wilsons Promontory
 Western Port Bay area
 Phillip Island
 French Island

North-East
 Victorian Alps
 Hume
 Ovens and Murray
 Goulburn Valley

North-West
 Mallee
 Loddon-Campaspe

West
 Grampians
 Central Highlands
 Grampians National Park
 Wimmera

South-West
 Barwon South West
 Otway Ranges
 Cape Otway

Eastern Uplands (Victorian Alps)

Topography and hydrology
Centred on the main divide in eastern Victoria, the Eastern Uplands separate the streams and rivers draining north to the Murray-Darling Basin from those flowing southwards directly to the sea. It is the largest and most diverse geomorphic region in the State.

The main streams draining northwards are the Goulburn, Campaspe, Mitta Mitta, Kiewa, Loddon, Avoca, Wimmera, Ovens and King Rivers. The most important streams flowing southwards to the sea are the Latrobe, Thomson, Macalister, Mitchell, Tambo, Nicholson and Snowy Rivers and their tributaries. All these rivers, with the exception of the Snowy River, reach the sea through the Gippsland Lakes of south-eastern Victoria. Further east, the Bemm, Cann and Genoa Rivers flow directly into Bass Strait to drain the eastern division of the Eastern Uplands. The Yarra River, flowing into Port Phillip Bay, drains the southwest area of the Uplands. The south-west of the state is dominated by the Hopkins and Glenelg rivers. The longest river in Victoria is the Goulburn, which rises below the peak of Corn Hill (1,331 m) and flows into the Murray river near Echuca. It is over 650 kilometers long.

Major peaks on the Great Divide in the Eastern Uplands include Mount Cobberas (1,833 m) near the border with New South Wales, Mount Hotham (1,862 m) and Mount Howitt (1,746 m). Victoria's highest mountain, Mount Bogong (1,986 m), is just north of the main range on a ridge that separates the upper reaches of the Mitta Mitta River from the Kiewa River. Other prominent peaks are Mount Feathertop (1,922 m), also to the north of the Divide, and Mount Buller (1,804 m) to the north west of Mount Howitt. Mount Wellington (1,632 m) lies at the southern end of the Snowy Range. The highest point south of the main divide is Mount Reynard which lies at an elevation of 1,737 meters.

Dendritic patterns of narrow ridges and valleys are typical of the region and characterise much of the deeply dissected landscape on either side of the Great Divide. Occasional isolated summits such as Mount Buller and Feathertop stand above the remnant plateaus or broad ridges.

Extensive landscapes of low relief occur at higher altitudes in the form of plateaus such as the Bogong High Plains, the plateaus of Mount Buffalo (about 1,400 m) and the Baw Baw Plateau, which are collectively commonly referred to as “high plains”. Extensive plateaus at successively lower elevations also frequent the further they are from the main divide. These include the Pinnibar plateau in the north-east, Nunniong plains to the south (about 1,200 m), and the Koetong - Shelly, Wabonga and Strathbogie plateaus further north (about 600–1,100 m).

The northerly draining valleys widen and the stream gradients gradually decrease as they near the Riverine Plain to the north and west of the region. The lower reaches of these streams have flood plains of fine sediments flanked by several sets of terraces. Alluvial or colluvial formations emerge from minor valleys of small ephemeral streams that drain the interfluves of major valleys. The ridges, as they approach the lowland plains, give way to low hills which mark the later stages of erosion of the upland ridges.

The floodplain and terraces of the Murray River at Wodonga indicate the eastern edge of the Northern Riverine Plain and the northern edge of the Eastern Uplands, at which point the floodplain is only about 150 m above sea level, consequently causing the flow of the major river systems in the region to have carved deep, narrow valleys in their upper reaches over time where the gradients are much steeper than along the floodplains.

South of the Great Divide the river systems increase in gradient and valley depth, and as they approach the Eastern Plain, having narrower alluviated valleys than those in the north. Large lowland areas enclosed by steep ridges such as the Murmungee basin south of Beechworth and the Dargo area south of the Divide, occur in parts of the Eastern Uplands. These are found where more readily weathered and eroded rocks occur surrounded by resistant rocks. The southern boundary of the Eastern Uplands is the southern extremity of an uneven bench-like platform known as the Nillumbik Terrain, which can be traced bordering the Eastern Plain from near Orbost to the eastern suburbs of Melbourne. The Eastern Uplands extend to the coast from Cape Conran to Rams Head, where the Nillumbik Terrain is absent, and is fringed with coastal sand dunes in parts.

Botany
Tall, thick forests of Alpine Ash occur on the upper mountain slopes, while the world's tallest hardwood tree, Mountain Ash, is found at slightly lower altitudes in the west of the region, with a typical variety of mixed-species eucalypts in conjunction with Ti-Tree shrubs composing the remainder of the forested portion of the Eastern Uplands.

The high plains are dominated by grasslands, herbfields, and heath communities which are widespread in areas where cold air drainage limits woody plant growth, with sphagnum bogs and fens in permanently wet areas. Snow Gum woodlands occupy the rocky knolls and ridges above approximately 1400–1500 m.

Western Uplands (Grampians)

Dissected uplands

Strike ridges & valleys (Grampians range)

Low elevation plateau (Tablelands)

Southern Uplands (Strzelecki & Otways)

250-600m (Otway, Strzelecki & Hoddle Ranges)

100-250m

Below 100m

Northern riverine plains (Murray Valley & Riverina)

Modern floodplains

Older alluvial plains

Alluvial fans & aprons

Hills & low hills

North-Western Dunefields & Plains (Wimmera & The Mallee)

Calcareous dunefields

Siliceous dunefields (Sunset, Big & Little Deserts)

Depressions

Clay plains with subdued ridges

Ridges with sand & flats

Hills & low hills

Western Plains (Glenelg-Hopkins)

Volcanic plains

Sedimentary plains

Hills & low hills

Eastern Plains (Gippsland)

Central sunklands

South-eastern riverine plains

High level terraces & fans

Coastal

Active cliffs (Port Campbell)

Steep slopes with basal cliffs (Cape Otway)

Stranded cliffs (Gippsland Lakes)

Coastal barriers (Ninety Mile Beach)

Transgressive dunes

Low coasts (wetlands & tidal reaches)

Central bays (Port Phillip & Western Port)

Engineered coast (Port Melbourne)

References

External links
Maps
DPI

 
Victoria